Laxman Aelay (born 8 June 1965) is an Indian painter whose work is inspired by the poverty of people in his village, whom he often depicts against the backdrop of their homes. He has also produced monochromes and hyperrealistic art.

Early life 
Aelay was born in Kadirenigudem in Nalgonda district. He received his Bachelor of Fine Arts in Painting and a Master of Fine Arts from the College of Fine Arts at JNAFAU.

Career 

At an exhibition in 2006, he created artworks using images captured in Kadirenigudem, sketching on the prints or blending and smudging in Photoshop.

Emblem of Telangana
He created the Telangana Logo, which contains  imagery of both the country and the state of Telangana.

Awards 
 1987: BRONZE MEDAL in the Painting Competition conducted by Amateur Artist Association, Nalgonda, Andhra Pradesh 
 1993: GOLD MEDAL in the Painting Competition conducted by Konaseema Chithrakala Parishath, Amalapuram, Andhra Pradesh 
 1995: Appreciation Award from Hyderabad Art Society at Annual Painting Competition

References

External links 

Indian male painters
Living people
Telugu people
People from Nalgonda
1964 births
20th-century Indian painters
Painters from Andhra Pradesh
20th-century Indian male artists